Haakon Maurice Chevalier (Lakewood Township, New Jersey, September 10, 1901 – July 4, 1985) was an American writer, translator, and professor of French literature at the University of California, Berkeley best known for his friendship with physicist J. Robert Oppenheimer, whom he met at Berkeley, California in 1937.

Oppenheimer's relationship with Chevalier, and Chevalier's relationship with a possible recruiter for Soviet intelligence, figured prominently in a 1954 hearing of the U.S. Atomic Energy Commission on Oppenheimer's security clearance. At that hearing, Oppenheimer's security clearance was revoked.

Early life
Chevalier was born September 10, 1901 in Lakewood Township, New Jersey to French and Norwegian parents.
When he was in his twenties he felt attracted by the romantic aspects of seafaring and embarked as a deckhand on one of the last commercial sailing ships, the four-masted US schooner Rosamond for a voyage to the southern ocean and Cape Town. He left a vivid and nostalgic testimony of this very end of the age of sail in his book The Last Voyage of the Schooner Rosamond.

Work
In 1945, Chevalier served as a translator for the Nuremberg Trials. He translated many works by Salvador Dalí, André Malraux, Vladimir Pozner, Louis Aragon, Frantz Fanon and Victor Vasarely into English.

Relationship with Oppenheimer
Chevalier met Oppenheimer in 1937 at Berkeley while he was an associate professor of Romance languages. Together, Chevalier and Oppenheimer would found the Berkeley branch of a teachers' union, which sponsored benefits for leftist causes.

Chevalier informed Oppenheimer in 1942 of a discussion he had with George Eltenton which disturbed him considerably and thought Oppenheimer ought to know about, regarding Soviet attempts through Eltenton to penetrate the Manhattan Project. That short conversation, and Oppenheimer's belated reporting of it and attempts to obscure the identity of Chevalier, would later become one of the key issues in Oppenheimer's security hearings in front of the Atomic Energy Commission in 1954 which resulted in the revocation of his security clearance.

Chevalier is interviewed in The Day After Trinity (1981), an Oscar-nominated documentary about Oppenheimer and the atomic bomb.

Later life and death
After the House Subcommittee on Un-American Activities hearing, Chevalier lost his job at Berkeley in 1950 and was unable to find another professorship in the United States and thus moved to France, where he continued to work as a translator.

Chevalier returned to the United States briefly in July 1965 to attend his daughter's wedding in San Francisco.

Chevalier died in 1985 in Paris at the age of 83. The cause of death was not reported.

Bibliography
1932. The ironic temper: Anatole France and his time. Oxford University Press. ASIN B00085MTLU
1934. André Malraux and "Man's fate": An essay. H. Smith and R. Haas. ASIN B00089VCSC
1949. For Us The Living. New York: Alfred A. Knopf. 
1959. The Man Who Would Be God. Putnam; [1st American ed.]. ASIN B0006AW3DG
1965. Oppenheimer: The Story of a Friendship. New York: George Braziller, Inc. ASIN B0006BN686
1970. The Last Voyage of the Schooner Rosamond. Deutsch.

Translations
 Vladimir Pozner. 1942. The Edge of the Sword (Deuil en 24 heures). Modern Age Books.
 Vladimir Pozner. 1943. First Harvest (Les Gens du pays).
 Kessel, Joseph. 1944. Army of Shadows (L'Armée des ombres). Alfred A. Knopf
Malraux, André. 1961. Man's Fate. Random House Modern Library. ASIN B000BI694M
Aragon, Louis. 1961. Holy Week. G. P. Putnam's Sons. ASIN B000EWMJ3A
Dalí, Salvador. 1986. The Secret Life of Salvador Dalí. Dasa Edicions, S.A. 
Maurois, Andrei. 1962. Seven faces of love. Doubleday. ASIN B0007H6IX4
Michaux, Henri. 1963. Light Through Darkness. Orion Press. ASIN B0007E4GJ0
Vasarely, Victor. 1965. Plastic Arts of the Twentieth Century, Volume 1. Editions du Griffon. ASIN B000FH4NZG
Fanon, Frantz, A Dying Colonialism 1965

See also
J. Robert Oppenheimer
Oppenheimer security hearing

References
Broad, William J. September 8, 2002. Father of A-bomb was Communist, book claims. New York Times. A7.
Gray, Gordon. 1954. In the matter of J. Robert Oppenheimer: transcript of hearing before Personnel Security Board. U.S. Govt. Print. Off. p. 4-6.
Herken, Gregg. 2002. Brotherhood of the Bomb: The Tangled Lives and Loyalties of Robert Oppenheimer, Ernest Lawrence, and Edward Teller. New York: Henry Holt and Company, LLC.
New York Times. July 11, 1985. Haakon Chevalier, 83, Author and Translator. Section B; Page 6, Column 4; National Desk.
Washington Post. July 11, 1985. 'Metro; Deaths Elsewhere. C7.

Notes

External links
1982 Audio Interview with Haakon Chevalier by Martin Sherwin Voices of the Manhattan Project
Primary sources used by Herken in Brotherhood of the Bomb
Annotated bibliography for Haakon Chevalier from the Alsos Digital Library for Nuclear Issues
Vladimir Pozner se souvient

1901 births
1985 deaths
People from Lakewood Township, New Jersey
American people of French descent
American people of Norwegian descent
Members of the Communist Party USA
American translators
Translators from French
Translators to English
University of California, Berkeley College of Letters and Science faculty
J. Robert Oppenheimer
20th-century translators
American expatriates in France